First Student UK was the brand used by FirstGroup for student transport in the United Kingdom. The brand was originally used in the United States for school transport there, and was expanded to the United Kingdom in 2000. First Student UK was a pioneer in the introduction of task-specific school buses in Britain, usually painted school bus yellow to distinguish them from conventional buses.

Development

First West Yorkshire successfully piloted one of the first yellow school bus schemes in the Huddersfield and Calderdale area in 2000.

In 2002, another early scheme began in Wrexham, Wales. It was contracted to First Cymru, who began to operate the scheme in June of that year. FirstGroup's chief executive Moir Lockhead said "we believe that the yellow school bus offers the safest, most reliable way to transport children to and from school". As with other schemes, including one in Runnymede in Surrey set up around the same time, First had to open new bases to operate the school buses, having no other operations in the respective areas. The first schemes also had buses built like traditional US school buses, whereas later schemes have more conventional UK bus shapes.

By October 2002, FirstGroup's first Welsh scheme had proved successful enough for the fleet of buses to be doubled.

As further schemes developed, First became more involved in setting up schemes. First Berkshire, already running the Runnymede First Student service, won the contract from Surrey County Council in 2005 to operate the Ride Pegasus! school bus scheme, although using buses in a different livery. However, this ended in July 2010 following the withdrawal of funding.

In December 2007, a yellow school bus visited Perth, Scotland, to test reactions. FirstGroup suggested that their research shows 86% of British parents would like to send their children to school in dedicated buses.

To develop this system in the United Kingdom the company decided to bring in American knowledge in the form of managing director Linda Howard, who had owned and operated her own school bus company in the States before it was acquired by First.

In 2008, one bus toured the country on trials. The campaigns continued. Former Home Secretary David Blunkett supports the use of yellow school buses, and in 2008 worked with First to campaign for wider use of the school bus system.

Former operations

First Student UK took 8,000 students to and from school in the UK, every day. Fifteen school bus systems were operated, two in Scotland, two in Wales and the rest in England.

In contrast to the North American division, where school busing is a primary function, First Student UK takes advantage of the existence of a First Group operating base throughout the country. Yellow School Bus schemes are run on behalf of the local authority by an existing subsidiary of First or sub-contracted to an independent operator where they do not have a presence.

One of the biggest schemes, First Halifax was the largest provider of yellow school buses on behalf of West Yorkshire Metro. First West Yorkshire was also involved in a First Student school bus scheme. They ran 81 school buses every day on [West Yorkshire Metro's My Bus scheme. First Berkshire ran a small scheme in Runnymede. Another scheme was run on behalf of Hampshire County Council, with handful of buses operated to selected schools by First Hampshire & Dorset.

Ride Pegasus!

Ride Pegasus! was a school bus scheme run by First Berkshire & The Thames Valley under contract to Surrey Country Council. The scheme, which required 22 buses, served 14 primary schools in the Guildford area and carried 850 children each day for a cost of £900,000 per year. Some non-school "Access Bus" services, primarily for senior citizens, were also run, as was the Guildford park & ride route 300 to Merrow. Buses were run from the council depot in Merrow Lane, which was treated as an outstation to one of First Berkshire's main depots. Ride Pegasus stopped running on 23 July 2010, at the end of the 2010 school year, due to the withdrawal of financing by the council.

The intention to start a school bus operation in Surrey was first announced by Surrey County Council in 2002, and was initially named Project Pegasus. In April 2005 the Department of Transport branded the plan, now known as the Pegasus School Bus Project, "low value for money" and decided not to fund a pilot scheme. However, by January 2006 funding had been arranged for a pilot scheme to begin at Tillingbourne School in Chilworth, with an official launch on 17 March 2006. Over the following five years it was expanded to cover 14 schools in the area, although it continued to be only a pilot with a projected end date of December 2010.

In September 2009 Surrey County Council announced a decision to cease funding the program from July 2010, citing the cost of £900,000 per year as too expensive for a system which benefited only 1% of Surrey schoolchildren. A petition against the decision received 1,500 signatures in 11 days. The decision was reviewed in November 2009 with a view to extending the service to operate until July 2011, but despite criticism was not overturned. The park and ride contract also ended in July 2010; it was initially due to finish in December 2010, but was brought forward to coincide with the end of the school bus operation.

The 22 buses used on the service returned to owners Surrey County Council at the end of the scheme. All were East Lancs Myllennium bodied Dennis Dart SLFs. They were loaned to other operators; three to Safeguard Coaches for continued use on the Guildford park and ride, one to Arriva Guildford & West Surrey and 14 to Abellio Surrey, the latter two as part of Surrey County Council's Bus Review. The final four were loaned to Southdown PSV. Stagecoach South now operates all of the town's Park & Ride network; two of the buses used are ex-Pegasus.

Vehicles
Seventy-one BMC 1100FEs were purchased.

References

External links

First Student UK
BBC News - Yellow buses fleet set to double

FirstGroup bus operators in England
School bus operators
Transport companies established in 2000
2000 establishments in the United Kingdom